Marc Pfertzel (born 21 May 1981) is a French former professional footballer who played as a right winger or right wing-back, and manager of French club FU Narbonne.

Career

France
Born in Mulhouse, Pfertzel started his career in the youth team of his local club FC Mulhouse in Alsace.

In 2001–02, Pfertzel moved to Ligue 1 club ES Troyes AC, but played onlyfor the reserve team. So he decided to leave the club after only one season and moved Championnat National club FC Sète 34. In the 2002–03 season, he played 36 matches for the club from Southern France.

Livorno
Again he stayed only for one season at a club. In July 2003, Pfertzel moved to Italian Serie B club AS Livorno. The club was promoted in his first season into the Serie A and Pfertzel played 84 matches in that league. The highlight of his AS Livorno period was the qualification to the UEFA Cup in the 2006–07 season. Since Juventus F.C., S.S. Lazio and ACF Fiorentina were punished because of the 2006 Serie A scandal, Livorno climbed from the ninth to the sixth spot and was allowed to play in the 2006–07 UEFA Cup. Livorno did quite well and was eliminated in the round of the last 32 by later finalist Espanyol Barcelona.

VfL Bochum
In the summer of 2007, Pfertzel moved to German Bundesliga club VfL Bochum. He signed a four-year contract which was valid in the first and second Bundesliga. To make this transfer happening, Pfertzel even accepted a lower salary so that this money could be invested in the transfer fee.

Union Berlin
On 25 May 2011, it was announced that Pfertzel had secured a free transfer to German 2. Bundesliga side 1. FC Union Berlin on a two-year deal.

SV Sandhausen
In July 2014, Pfertzel left Union Berlin and joined fellow 2. Bundesliga club SV Sandhausen. However, he only earned caps in the first leg of the campaign, being told to be redundant by head coach Alois Schwartz in the winter break. At the end of the 2014–15 season, Pfertzel retired from professional football.

Coaching career
After retiring at the end of the 2017–18 season, Pfertzel became the manager of the reserve of his former club FC Sète 34. In the summer 2019, he was appointed manager of FU Narbonne.

Personal life
Upon his retirement from professional football in 2015, he moved back to his native France, settling in Paris. There he works for an insurance company, specializing in serving athletes.

Career statistics

References

External links
 
 

French football managers
French footballers
French expatriate footballers
FC Mulhouse players
ES Troyes AC players
FC Sète 34 players
U.S. Livorno 1915 players
VfL Bochum players
VfL Bochum II players
Kavala F.C. players
1. FC Union Berlin players
SV Sandhausen players
Championnat National players
Serie A players
Serie B players
Bundesliga players
2. Bundesliga players
Super League Greece players
Expatriate footballers in Italy
Expatriate footballers in Germany
Expatriate footballers in Greece
Footballers from Mulhouse
1981 births
Living people
Association football wingers
Association football defenders